Sanchai Ratiwatana and Sonchat Ratiwatana were the defending champions but decided not to participate.
Samuel Groth and Toshihide Matsui won the final 7–6(8–6), 1–6, [10–4] against Artem Sitak and Jose Statham.

Seeds

Draw

Draw

References
 Main Draw

Internationaux de Nouvelle-Caledonie - Doubles
2013 Doubles